Qionglai could refer to the following locations in Sichuan Province, China:

Qionglai City (邛崃市), county-level city under the administration of Chengdu
Qionglai Mountains (邛崃山), mountain range